The Hungwe tribe was a south-central African tribe that settled in Zimbabwe.

Hungwe Tribe / Clan 
George Landow, a Professor of English and Art History at Brown University in the U.S points to a refusal by Europeans and their friends to embrace the fact that the Great Zimbabwe was built by the Karanga in general, and the Hungwe in particular.

"Since Europeans first encountered the ruins of Great Zimbabwe," he writes, "it has been the focus of ideological concern and conflict. Unwilling to believe that sub-Saharan Africans could have built such a structure, adventurers and ideologues long claimed the ruins a mystery, theorising that ancient Phoenicians, Arabs, Romans, or Hebrews created the structures. In fact, since archaeologist Gertrude Caton-Thompson's excavations in 1932, it has been widely known that Great Zimbabwe is truly of Africa and less than 1000 years old.

"Nonetheless, the White Rhodesians, whose ideology proclaimed the land 'empty' of people and culture before they arrived, tried to rewrite history -- even asserting that an African genesis for Great Zimbabwe was tantamount to treason," says Landow.

Historian Tudor Parfitt described the works by some early Great Zimbabwe Historian as intended to "show that black people had never been capable of building in stone or of governing themselves".

Hungwe is a huge clan in Zimbabwe which is called so many names,others call them Chasura, Maoko Mavi, Varidzi WoNyika, Vaera Denga & others call them Nyoni. They are all still the same fish eagle clan. 

Nemato is believed to have come from the lower Zambezi in southern part of a nation currently known as Zambia. 

Nemato was the father of Sakunara and Chasura. From Sakunara and Chasura grew the hungwe tribe.
The Hungwe public are a clan discovered across Zimbabwe and accepted to be the soonest Bantu-talking occupants of advanced Zimbabwe and whose appearance was just gone before by the San and Khoi. 

It is felt that the first Shona inhabitants of Zimbabwe are completely typified under the umbrella name "Hungwe". The vanquishers of the Hungwe fall under the sweeping name "Mbire". It is accepted that it was the Mbire who were the authors of the Mutapa Empire just as the Rozvi Empire which was decimated by the different Nguni clans that went through the place where there is the Rhodesia during the Mfecane wars. These Nguni clans were the Ndebele who presently possess southwest Zimbabwe, and the Shangane clan in the southeast of Zimbabwe. The Hungwe it is said settled in Zimbabwe for likely a few hundred years before the Mbire showed up. 

Relatives of the Hungwe clan are today found geologically amassed in Somabhula, Filabusi, Mberengwa and Gwanda zones where they speak Ndebele; Masvingo, Shurugwi and Zvishavane regions where they speak chiKaranga, Plumtree, Bulili and Mangwe territories where they speak Chikalanga, the Zambezi Valley zones of Hwange, Binga and Dande where they speak ChiNambiya and ChiTonga; and the Chipinge and Chimanimani zones in the east of Zimbabwe where they speak chiNdau. Past the fringes of Zimbabwe, Hungwe relatives are accepted to be found among the BaVenda in South Africa, BaKalanga in Botswana, BaTonga in Zambia, and VaNdau in Manyika and Shangaan in Mozambique. 

George Landow, a Professor of English and Art History at Brown University in the U.S highlighted a refusal by Europeans and their companions to grasp the way that the Great Zimbabwe was worked by the Karanga as a rule, and the Hungwe specifically. 

"Since Europeans initially experienced the vestiges of Great Zimbabwe," he expresses, "it has been the focal point of philosophical concern and struggle. Reluctant to accept that sub-Saharan Africans could have assembled such a structure, explorers and ideologues since quite a while ago guaranteed the vestiges a puzzle, guessing that old Phoenicians, Arabs, Romans, or Hebrews made the structures. Indeed, since excavator Gertrude Caton-Thompson's unearthings in 19321 it has been generally realized that Great Zimbabwe is genuinely of Africa promotion African beginning. 

This denialism likewise reaches out to the Karanga/Shona clans who exclusively have contended energetically to demonstrate they manufactured Great Zimbabwe, quite the Rozvi. Nonetheless, chronicled realities show that it wasn't until the sixteenth century that a Rozvi state was set up. The Rozvi are important for the Mbire trespassers who took over Great Zimbabwe from the first leaders of the Hungwe-Dzivaguru emblems. While the Mbire intruders kept on including the Hungwe in the political, monetary and strict exercises of Great Zimbabwe, it tends to be contended that they assumed control over a working state with the stone structures previously worked by the Hungwe-Dziva individuals. In contrast to Great Zimbabwe and Khami which were worked by the Hungwe, the Rozvi are credited with building a Khami stage site, Danamombe (Dhlo-Dhlo), which turned into their new capital. 

It's accepted the development of Great Zimbabwe is additionally asserted by the Lemba. This ethnic gathering of Zimbabwe and South Africa has a convention of antiquated Jewish or South Arabian plunge through their male line, which is upheld by ongoing DNA studies, and female family got from the Karanga subgroup of the Shona." However, the Lemba just arrived at the northern piece of South Africa around the thirteenth Century route after the breakdown of Mapungubwe and Great Zimbabwe was at that point in decrease. 

Aeneas Chigwedere's book The Great Zimbabwe State and Its Off-Shoots AD 1000-1700 rushes to bring up that Zimbabweans, as different Africans, 'didn't tumble from the sky' however originated from some place. "Each African race seems to have started in North-East Africa." says Chigwedere. "We can thusly accept that even our dark race started in North-East Africa." 

The book centers around the account of three clans that moved to frame Zimbabwe. As per Chigwedere, these clans are the Dau Tonga Beja, Dziva Hungwe Kalanga and Nyai Soko. Chigwedere handles the social, political and monetary viewpoints that made up the clans. 

Monetary exercises included mining, chasing, farming and assembling, in addition to other things. 

"Mining was a significant industry of the Mbire Nyai people group as much as it was significant for the lives of both the Dau Tonga and Dziva Hungwe Masters of Water," composes Chigwedere.

References
Caton-Thompson, G. and Gardner, E., 1932. The Prehistoric Geography Of Kharga Oasis. [Erscheinungsort nicht ermittelbar]: [Verlag nicht ermittelbar]

Ethnic groups in Zimbabwe